Belasco is a fictional supervillain appearing in American comic books published by Marvel Comics. The character's first appearance was in Ka-Zar the Savage #11; he was created by Bruce Jones and Brent Anderson.

Fictional character biography
Belasco is an ancient, evil sorcerer serving the Elder Gods, and is perhaps best known for his kidnapping of Illyana Rasputin.

Early history
Belasco's early history is told by the poet Dante, though there is some dispute as to the veracity of these accounts. Allegedly, Belasco was a sorcerer in 13th Century Florence, Italy who used his knowledge of alchemy and the black arts to contact the Elder Gods (actually extra-dimensional demonic entities). He forged a pact with them enabling them to cross the barrier to our dimension using a pentagonal arrangement of five Bloodstones. In return, Belasco was granted immortality and immense mystical power. He was also given a demonic appearance, as he was intended to form a new race of Earth-dwelling demons.

To this end, he kidnapped Bice "Beatrice" dei Portinari, beloved of Dante, to give birth to the first of this new race. He fled with her to the Atlantean isle of Pangea, where the Elder Gods directed him to Mt. Flavius, where their summoning ritual could take place. While en route, Belasco raped Beatrice, and she was nine months pregnant by the time they arrived. He embarked onto the island, closely pursued by Dante, and took Beatrice into a network of underground passages designed to resemble Hell. Dante found them just in time to witness Beatrice dying in childbirth and, enraged, he attacked Belasco. During the battle, a pipe was accidentally struck, releasing an unknown liquid that placed Belasco in suspended animation. At some point on the island, Belasco also lost the locket containing the Bloodstones.

Modern history

In recent years, the volcano mountain becomes active again, releasing Belasco. He quickly locates the locket and finds a new sacrifice, Shanna O'Hara. He places her under his mental control and begins the spell. He seeks to make Shanna the mother of a demonic race he would father. However, Shanna's mate Ka-Zar appears and hurls the locket into the volcano, sealing away the Elder Gods and apparently destroying Belasco.

However, he instead is trapped in Limbo, also called Otherplace, where he spends his years conquering it. Once complete, he draws the young Illyana Rasputina to him and she is transported to Limbo. His intention is to make her his disciple and use her to open a gateway for the Elder Gods. The X-Men follow to save Illyana. Due to the warping of space and time in Limbo, there are two alternate but equally valid outcomes to the rescue attempt. In one, the X-Men transport Illyana back to Earth, but are themselves trapped in Limbo, and are one-by-one killed by Belasco and his minions over the course of several decades; in the other, the X-Men escape back to Earth and Illyana is trapped in Limbo. He makes Illyana his apprentice in the dark arts, transforming her into a "demon sorceress." He forcibly shapes part of her soul into the first Bloodstone, giving her great potential for power and allowing him to hold sway over her so that she willingly creates a second. However, after guidance from the remaining X-Men in Limbo, she rebels against him, driving him from Limbo. Magik is later deposed as the ruler of Limbo by the demon S'ym.

During Illyana's seduction, Belasco also attempts to transform Ka-Zar and Shanna into demons to be parents to a new demonic race. He is seemingly defeated when Ka-Zar impales Belasco on his own sword. Belasco is next revealed to be the new master of the Cat People.

Belasco eventually takes control of Limbo once more. The cultist "Rev" worships Belasco, mistaking him for Lucifer. Belasco seeks to wipe out humanity, using the Rev as a pawn. The Rev is defeated and killed by the Punisher.

Belasco also turns Alpha Flight-ally Witchfire against her team by influencing her demonic side. She finally is restored to normal and returns to Beta Flight, Alpha Flight's support group.

Later, Belasco and the fear-demon D'Spayre contested to corrupt Cable, the son of Madelyne Pryor, who had been the ally of S'ym and N'astirh during "Inferno". Belasco banished D'Spayre and summoned himself, Cable, and Cable's ally Lee Forrester to Limbo, where S'ym threw Belasco out of his way and fought with Cable. Cable won, and he and Lee returned to Earth.

It was eventually revealed that Illyana's best friend Kitty Pryde had received Illyana's Soulsword after Illyana had died; in dying, she had bonded the Soulsword to Kitty's own essence. After Kitty's team Excalibur fought off several claimants to the sword, Nightcrawler's girlfriend Amanda Sefton was given the sword. She then gave the sword to her mother, Margali Szardos, who was in turn kidnapped by Belasco and brought to Limbo. Nightcrawler and Sefton freed her, and Sefton secretly took the sword and adopted the codename Magik for herself. Belasco and his allies, the N'Garai demons, fought the X-Men again soon after, but were defeated by the X-Men with the assistance of the new Magik.

Quest for Magik
Cast into an even lower level of hell by his disappointed gods, Belasco used the life-force of a low level demon to regain access to the Limbo dimension after seeing a version of Magik (Illyana Rasputin) alive which was brought back when the Scarlet Witch House of M. Once there, Belasco fought his way through Amanda Sefton's minions and even used a Bloodstone containing a portion of Illyana's soul, to resurrect Illyana in her Darkchylde form to overthrow Sefton, however his creation had all of Illyana's memories but lacked her soul. Disappointed, Belasco banished her before battling the sorceress himself. As opposed to their first battle, Belasco was successful and cast Amanda out of Limbo, becoming Limbo's ruler once again. Belasco then summoned the New X-Men because he felt the scent of the House of M Magik on them. It is revealed that Belasco's fixation on Illyana is not simply for her powers, but also because he fell in love with her. Finally Belasco was defeated by Magik with the help of a reformed Pixie, who stabbed him with a 'Souldagger'. Now Magik is the new ruler of Limbo, served by S'ym and N'astirh and in search of her soul.

Dark Web
During the "Dark Web" storyline, Belasco saves Mary Jane Watson and Black Cat from some demons. He would like to make use of Black Cat to obtain his misplaced Soulsword from the Screaming Tower where they will have competition from the Thief Army, the Heven's Devils, the HYDRA Expedition Force Agares, and S'ym. To help them out, Belasco skins himself and uses part of his soul to make a Soul Compass.

Powers and abilities
Belasco is one of the most powerful sorcerers on Earth and possesses a wide knowledge of the mystical black arts. He possesses the ability to manipulate the forces of magic for a variety of effects, including the ability to fire concussive bolts of mystical energy, create protective shields of mystical energy, transform and transmute matter both living and inanimate, travel inter-dimensionally, shoot mystical rays, control the minds of humans and animals, and raise the dead under certain circumstances. He has an encyclopedic knowledge of spells from a variety of books of occult spells that he can use.

He was also endowed by the Elder Gods with immortality and some degree of invulnerability. His demonic form apparently also possesses augmented physical strength, as he was effortlessly able to overpower Ka-Zar with his one good arm, and pick him up by his throat using his tail. However, his own sword, which was forged by the Elder Gods themselves, has the power to harm him. It was this which cut off his right arm under unrevealed circumstances.

Belasco's powers are somehow linked to those of Magik. When they fought a battle in Otherplace and Magik took on her "Darkchilde" form, Belasco simultaneously reverted to human form, losing most of his power and his invulnerability in the process.

He has also come to possess a wide knowledge of the advanced technology left by the Atlanteans in Pangea.

Additionally, he is an exceptional swordsman and battle tactician and was seen wielding a battle axe with great skill.

Other versions

Universe X
In the futuristic Universe X maxi-series by Jim Krueger and Alex Ross, Belasco is Nightcrawler of the X-Men, who had become amnesiac and was displaced in time.

References

External links
 Ballad of Belasco at UncannyXmen.Net
 Marvel Universe

Comics characters introduced in 1982
Fictional characters with immortality
Fictional rapists
Marvel Comics characters who use magic
Marvel Comics demons
Marvel Comics male supervillains
Marvel Comics mutates